Marilyn Christine Bridges (born 1948) is an American photographer noted for her fine art black and white aerial photographs of extraordinary ancient and modern landscapes. She has photographed sacred and secular sites in over 20 countries, including Peru, Mexico, France, Britain, Egypt, Greece, Turkey, Australia, Namibia, Indonesia and India. Bridges is a licensed pilot and a Fellow of the Explorers Club. She lives in New York.

Bridges' work has been exhibited in over 300 museums and galleries, including solo exhibitions at the Smithsonian Institution in Washington DC, the Moscow House of Photography in Russia, the Field Museum of Natural History in Chicago, the George Eastman House in Rochester, the Royal Ontario Museum in Toronto, and the International Center of Photography in New York. Museums with extensive collections of her work include the Center for Creative Photography in Tucson, the International Center of Photography in New York, the Museum of Modern Art in New York, the Penn Museum in Philadelphia, and the Musée de la Photographie à Charleroi in Belgium. Her photographs have been published in major magazines, including Vanity Fair, Condé Nast Traveler, Time, Life, Archaeology, Smithsonian and The New York Times Magazine. She is the author of eight books.

Biography 
Marilyn Bridges studied photography at the Rochester Institute of Technology (RIT), where she earned a Bachelor of Fine Arts (1979) and a Master of Fine Arts (1981).

She began her career in aerial photography in 1976 in the Peruvian desert. Bridges hired a small airplane to fly over the mysterious Nazca Lines, the largest concentration of earth drawings in the world. “At RIT she printed her Peruvian negatives as her first school project. Her technique was not yet polished, but the deep shadows, the eloquent light, and sense of time standing unnaturally still were present in every print. Bridges already had her style ... Cornell Capa, the dean of American photography, saw her work, admired it, and the American Museum of Natural History in New York gave her an exhibition.”

In 1982, after receiving a Guggenheim Fellowship, Bridges flew in a small single-engine Cessna from New York to the Yucatán, where she photographed ancient Mayan sites, some still partially overgrown by the dense jungle. Many of these photographs appeared in her 1986 book Markings: Aerial Views of Sacred Landscapes, which also includes photographs of Nazca, Native American archaeological sites, and megalithic monuments in Britain and Brittany. Bridges returned to Peru on a Fulbright Scholarship and published many of the resulting photographs in her 1991 book Planet Peru: An Aerial Journey Through a Timeless Land. In Egypt in 1993-94 she obtained unusual permission to fly over the Valley of the Kings and along the Nile. Leaning out of an old Russian military helicopter, she photographed dozens of ancient sites. The result was a unique collection of aerial photographs in her 1996 book Egypt: Antiquities from Above. Closer to home Bridges photographed ancient and contemporary sites across the United States, from Pre-Columbian mounds in the Midwest and geoglyphs in California, to lava flows in Hawaii and glaciers in Alaska. Many of these photographs are in her 1997 book This Land is Your Land: Across America by Air. Bridges also received a grant from the French government to make aerial photographs of historical and contemporary sites in the Calais region to document the changing environment in connection with the Channel Tunnel, as seen in her 1995 book Vue d’Oiseau. She received a similar grant from the Belgian government to document the landscape of Wallonia from the air, resulting in the 1999 book Vol au-dessus de la Wallonie. Both collections of photographs appeared in solo exhibitions in major museums throughout Europe. She has also photographed the ruins of classical cities and temples in Greece and Turkey. In 2009, she flew over Minoan sites in Crete, and the Onassis Foundation exhibited these photographs in New York City.

Bridges uses a medium format film camera, and takes photographs from a small airplane or helicopter with the door removed, usually from an altitude of 300 to 1000 feet. Her photographic prints are silver gelatin, and selenium toned.

Awards and honors 
 Guggenheim Fellowship (in Yucatán), 1982
 CAPS Grant, 1983
 National Endowment for the Arts Fellowship, 1984
 Elected Fellow of the Explorers Club, 1988
 Fulbright American Scholars Grant (in Peru), 1988–9
 Eastman Kodak Photography Grant, 1990
 Medal of Arles, Recontres Internationals de la Photographie, Arles, France, 1991
 Mission Photographique Transmanche Grant (in France), 1995
 Musée de la Photograpahie à Charleroi, Grant (in Belgium) 1999
 Wings Trust, Women of Discovery Award, 2003
 Institute for Aegean Prehistory Grant (in Crete), 2009

Publications 
Markings: Aerial Views of Sacred Landscapes (New York: Aperture, Inc., 1986; 2nd Edition, 1990). German Edition: Für die Götter: Luftaufnahmen heiliger Landschaften (Frankfurt: Zweitausandendeins, 1990)
The Sacred & Secular: A Decade of Aerial Photography (New York: International Center of Photography, 1990)
Planet Peru: An Aerial Journey Through A Timeless Land (New York: Aperture, Inc., 1991). German Edition: Planet Peru: Reise über ein zeitlosen Land (Frankfurt: Zweitausendeins, 1991)
Vue d'oiseau, la mission photographique transmanche (Douchy, France: Centre Regional de la Photographie, 1996)
Egypt: Antiquities from Above (Boston: Bulfinch Press, Little Brown & Co., 1996). German Edition: Ägypten: das Reich der Pharaonen aus der Luft betrachtet (Munich: Kindler, 1996). French Edition: L'Egypte vue du ciel (Paris: Editions du Seuil)
This Land Is Your Land: Across America by Air (New York: Aperture, 1997)
Vol au-dessus de la Wallonie (Charleroi, Belgium: Editions MET, Musée de la photographie à Charleroi, 1999)
Flights Through Time (Revere, Pennsylvania: Lodima Press, 2007)
In the footsteps of Alexander: An aerial adventure. Explorers Club Journal 85(3), pg 44-53 (2007)

Reviews and commentaries 
"Aside from their documentary value, the photographs are beautiful in themselves, taken with an artist’s eye for shapes and patterns."
– Grace Glueck, New York Times

"Her work combines an exquisite sense of composition and form with an appreciation of the cultural significance of the subjects she photographs."
– Craig Morris, Dean of Science, American Museum of Natural History

Marilyn Bridges’ aerial photographs . . . testify to an irresistible combination of artistry, technical competence and gung-ho tenacity.
– Jane Richards, The Independent (UK)

Marilyn Bridges, photographer, pilot and explorer, illuminates the bonds between the mark-makers of 3000 BC and the builders of our modern cities. Ancient or contemporary, Bridges’ landscapes serve the dual role of interpreting the power of extraordinary sites and creating visual records that may prove to be the only means of preserving these sites against the eroding elements of time and neglect. Bridges' work itself is about time, both geological and human.
– Willis Hartshorn, Director, International Center of Photography

For me, there's no other way to understand her photography without comprehending her continual hunt for secrets and mysteries. For her, the face of the earth is one glyph after another shrouded in shadows to be exposed and interpreted . . . Indeed, her hallmark is shadow, the sharp delineation of absent light. One could easily turn the etymology of photograph on its ear and call a Bridges aerial landscape an umbragraph, where darkness explains things – or at least exposes them – far more comprehensively than light does.
– William Least Heat-Moon, author of Blue Highways

References

External links
 Marilyn Bridges Photography
 International Center of Photography. Collections. Marilyn Bridges
 Center for Creative Photography. Bridges, Marilyn
 Photoarts, Marilyn Bridges overview

1948 births
Living people
20th-century American photographers
Rochester Institute of Technology alumni
American women photographers
21st-century American photographers
20th-century American women artists
21st-century American women artists
Fulbright alumni